Ramón Sánchez-Parodi Montoto (born 25 September 1938 in Consolación del Sur, Pinar del Río, Cuba) is a Cuban diplomat and writer. Sánchez-Parodi served as the first chief of the Cuban Interests Section in Washington, D.C. from September 1977 to April 1989. He then served as Deputy Foreign Minister (1989–1994) and as Ambassador to Brazil (1994–2000). He is now chief of the Department of International Relations at Cuba's Customs Agency and worked as a journalist and writer.

References

 Years of Renewal by Henry Kissinger; Simon and Schuster, 2000; 
 Cuba and the United States: a chronological history by Jane Franklin; Ocean Press, 1997; .
 José Martí y Eloy Alfaro: luchadores inclaudicables por la libertad de nuestra América by Ramón Sánchez-Parodi; Escuela de Liderazgo y Oratoria "Fidel Castro", 2003.
 Relaciones Cuba-Estados Unidos, 1977–1988 by Ramón Sánchez-Parodi; Instituto Matías Romero de Estudios Diplomáticos, 1988.
 The Miami Herald; CUBAN ENVOY ENDS EVENTFUL U.S. STAY; April 27, 1989 - Page 27A

Government ministers of Cuba
Ambassadors of Cuba to Brazil
Living people
Cuban diplomats
1938 births
Communist Party of Cuba politicians